State Route 119 (SR 119) is a  state highway in the U.S. state of Alabama that travels northeast from Pelham to Leeds. Although there are shorter and faster routes connecting Pelham and Leeds, SR 119 is a heavily traveled local highway that connects several suburbs and subdivisions in the suburbs of Birmingham. The southern terminus of SR 119 is at an intersection with SR 25 in Pelham, and the northern terminus of the highway is at an intersection with U.S. Route 78 (US 78) in Leeds.

Route description

SR 119 begins as a two-lane route, traveling through Montevallo, the home of the University of Montevallo. Going northward, SR 119 travels through Alabaster, where it follows US 31 to Pelham, where it branches off into its own route once again in the Oak Mountain State Park area, then to the eastern area of Hoover, and then crosses US 280 before reaching its northern terminus at an intersection with US 78 in Leeds.

History

Until the 1980s, much of the route of SR 119 traveled through rural areas of Shelby County. Suburban growth has led to commercial and residential growth adjoining the route. In 2005, a  section of SR 119 south of US 31 in Alabaster was widened to four lanes.

Major intersections

See also

References

119
Transportation in Shelby County, Alabama
Transportation in Jefferson County, Alabama
Montevallo, Alabama